3 of Hearts was an American country music trio composed of Blaire Stroud, Katie McNeill, and Deserea Wasdin, all natives of Fort Worth, Texas. Signed to RCA Nashville in 2001, the trio released its debut album in July of that year. Two of its singles entered the U.S. Billboard Hot Country Singles & Tracks charts, as did their rendition of "The Christmas Shoes."

Biography
Blaire Stroud, Katie McNeill, and Desera Wasdin first sang at a funeral; They were also students at L.D. Bell High School; later, they cut a demo tape which was eventually sent to RCA Nashville, who signed the trio to a record deal in 2000. They recorded the song, "Just Might Change Your Life", which appeared in the film and on the soundtrack for the film, "Where the Heart Is", in the Summer of 2000. 3 of Hearts also embarked on a tour sponsored by Seventeen magazine, in which the trio performed at shopping malls and promoted prom-related fashion trends.

Their debut album, also titled 3 of Hearts, was released in July 2001. Two of its singles ("Love Is Enough" and "Arizona Rain") entered the U.S. Billboard Hot Country Singles & Tracks charts, peaking at No. 43 and No. 59 respectively. However, 3 of Hearts did not enter the Top 40 on the country music charts until early 2002, when their rendition of "The Christmas Shoes" reached a peak of No. 39. The "Love is Enough" video gained play on the Disney Channel, Nickelodeon and Fox Family.

Discography

Studio albums

Singles

Music videos

References

Country music groups from Texas
American girl groups
Musical groups established in 2001
Musical groups disestablished in 2005
2001 establishments in Texas
RCA Records Nashville artists
Vocal trios
2005 disestablishments in Texas